STH BNK by Beulah is a dual skyscraper development proposed for Melbourne developed by Beulah and designed by architectural firms UNStudio and Cox Architecture. The site currently hosts a BMW dealership.

History

Site
The site for the development is 60 Southbank Boulevard, located in Southbank, an inner-city suburb of Melbourne, and is an amalgamation of two adjacent properties – 102-156 City Road and 158 City Road. In December 2017, Beulah International purchased the site from BMW for approximately $AUD101 million. In April 2021, Beulah acquired 158 City Road, with the intention of expanding the development. The  site is currently home to Hanover House, a seven storey commercial building, the tallest in Southbank between 1973 and 1990. The development will be situated in an area of Melbourne that has some of the tallest buildings in the city; for instance, the city's current tallest building, Australia 108, sits opposite the property at 70 Southbank Boulevard, whilst the previous tallest, Eureka Tower, is also in the vicinity.

Southbank competition
Beulah conducted a contest to determine the architect for the project, and dubbed the competition "STH BNK by Beulah". All six solicited bids involved two architectural firms, and partnerships included BIG Architects and Fender Katsalidis, MAD Studio and Elenberg Fraser, and Woods Bagot and MVRDV. The collaborative bid by UNStudio and Cox Architecture ultimately secured the commission. The winning design was announced in August 2018.

Project
The structure is part of the larger development on Melbourne's Southbank, estimated to cost AUD$2 billion. The development is planned to begin breaking ground in 2020. Green Spine is composed of two skyscrapers; Tower 1 will comprise 102 storeys and reach a height of 366 metres, surpassing the height of the current tallest building in Australia, Q1, which stands at 322 metres. The second tower will comprise 59 storeys and reach a height of 251 metres; as with Tower 1, the second building will include hotel rooms, residential apartments, and offices. Both skyscrapers will seem to curve in a twist and will have foliage and trees growing on balconies along their exteriors.

Approval
In March 2020, the plan received approval by the City of Melbourne. Planning Minister Richard Wynne approved the project on 23 April 2020; like other developments, STH BNK by Beulah was identified by the Victorian Government as a project needing to be "fast-tracked", amid the impact of the COVID-19 pandemic to the Victorian economy.

See also
 List of tallest buildings in Melbourne
 List of tallest buildings in Australia

External links

References

Skyscrapers in Melbourne
Residential skyscrapers in Australia
Apartment buildings in Melbourne
Proposed buildings and structures in Melbourne
Southbank, Victoria